The 2003 Ladbrokes.com World Darts Championship was the tenth World Championship organised by the Professional Darts Corporation since its split from the British Darts Organisation in 1993. The tournament took place between 27 December 2002 and 4 January 2003 at the Circus Tavern, Purfleet, England. Ladbrokes (who sponsored the 1996 event with their Vernon's brand) and took over sponsorship of the event from Skol.

The field at the televised stages expanded for the first time since 1999. An extra qualifying round was introduced increasing the total number of players from 32 to 40. John Part defeated the defending champion and number one seed, Phil Taylor, in the final to end two incredible runs by Taylor – eight successive World titles, and 44 successive victories at the Circus Tavern.

This was Part's second world championship having also won the 1994 BDO Championship (the first tournament after the split). As Raymond van Barneveld won the rival BDO World Darts Championship the same year, this was the first time that both versions of the world title were held by a player from outside the British Isles.

The Qualifying Criteria for the World Championship was as follows

-Top 32 of the Order of Merit (on 1 December 2002) 
- 4 PDPA Qualifiers (Al Hedman, Lee Palfeyman, Mark Robinson, Dave Smith)
- Australian Qualifier (Simon Whitlock)
- Dutch Qualifier (Arjan Moen)
- USA Qualifier (Ray Carver)
- SP 9-Dart challenge with The People Newspaper (David Platt)

Seeds

Prize money

Nine-dart finish: A diamond, worth a six figure sum, will be mounted in the bulls eye of a championship dartboard as a unique prize (not won).

Results

First round
All matches are the best of 7 sets.

Last 32

Representation from different countries
This table shows the number of players by country in the World Championship, the total number including the 1st round.

References

PDC World Darts Championships
PDC World Darts Championship 2003
PDC World Darts Championship 2003
PDC World Darts Championship
PDC World Darts Championship
PDC World Darts Championship
Purfleet
Sport in Essex